Didar Gurbangeldiyevich Durdyyev (born 16 July 1993) is a Turkmen professional footballer, who plays as a forward for Ýokary Liga club  FC Ahal and the Turkmenistan national football team.

Biography 
He was a pupil of the football school Olimp Aşgabat and a Student of the Turkmen State Institute of Economics and Management. Didar Durdyýew's father, Gurbangeldi, is also a former Turkmenistani footballer who played for the national team.

Club career 
He began his career in the football club FC Ahal and was the third top scorer of Turkmenistan in 2012 (14 goals).

He won the gold medal in the 2014 Ýokary Liga with Altyn Asyr FK, and was the second top scorer (26 goals). In February 2015, he played his last match with FC Altyn Asyr; in the AFC Cup against Al-Saqr.

Since March 2015, he has played for FC Hazyna.

In January 2020, Durdyýew went on trial with Kazakhstan First Division club FC Aktobe.

In March 2020, he signed a contract with the Uzbek club Mash'al Mubarek. On 7 March 2020, Durdyýew made his debut in the Uzbekistan Super League in a 1–0 loss against FC Bunyodkor. In August 2020 leaves club.

In March 2021, Durdyýew returned to FC Ahal.

Durdyýew's 27 league goals saw him finish the season as the top scorer in the 2022 Ýokary Liga  and helped to FC Ahal win the championship of Turkmenistan for the first time in history.

National team 
He played for Turkmenistan U22 in the 2013 Commonwealth of Independent States Cup.

Durdyýew made his senior national team debut in 2012 AFC Challenge Cup. He scored two goals against Laos in a 5–1 victory in the 2014 AFC Challenge Cup.

Honors
FC Ahal
 Ýokary Liga: 2022
 Turkmenistan Cup: 2022

Country
AFC Challenge Cup
Runners-up (1): 2012

References

External links

 Didar Durdyýew at GSA

1993 births
Living people
Turkmenistan footballers
Turkmenistan international footballers
FC Ahal players
FC Altyn Asyr players
FK Mash'al Mubarek players
People from Balkanabat
Association football forwards
Expatriate footballers in Uzbekistan
Uzbekistan Super League players
Turkmenistan expatriate footballers